Theileriosis may refer to:

 East Coast fever, a disease of cattle, sheep, and goats caused by the protozoan parasite Theileria parva
 Human theileriosis, caused by Theileria microti
 Tropical theileriosis, a theileriosis of cattle from the Mediterranean and Middle East area, from Morocco to Western parts of India and China, caused by Theileria annulata

See also
 Theileria, the genus of parasitic protozoan which causes theileriosis